The year 1684 in music involved some significant events.

Events
Antonio Stradivari makes the Bucher, Cipriani Potter and Cobbett ex Holloway violins.
 An adaptation of Fletcher's Valentinian features music composed by Louis Grabu.

Classical music 
Giovanni Battista Bassani – Affetti canori, cantate et ariette, Op.6
Dietrich Buxtehude 
Dein edles Herz, der Liebe Thron, BuxWV 14
Herr auf dich traue ich, BuxWV 35
Herr nun läßt du deinen Diener, BuxWV 37
Lobe den Herrn meine Seele, BuxWV 71
Marc-Antoine Charpentier 
Litanies de la Vierge, H.83
Pro omnibus festis B V M, H.333
In nativitatem Domini canticum, H.414
Sur la naissance de notre Seigneur Jésus Christ, H.482
Pastorale sur la Naissance de Notre Seigneur Jesus Christ, H.483
Michel Richard de Lalande – Te Deum S.32
Domenico Gabrielli – Balletti, Op.1
Giovanni Battista Granata – Armoniosi toni di varie suonate musicali per la chitarra spagnuola . . . Opera settima
Johann Krieger – Ich will in Friede fahren
Isabella Leonarda – Mottetti a voce sola, Op.11
Jean-Baptiste Lully 
Plaude laetare galia, LWV 37
Te Deum, LWV 55
De Profundis, LWV 62
John Playford – The Division Violin
Henry Purcell – From those serene and rapturous joys, Z.326
Pierre Robert – Motets pour la Chapelle du Roy
Alessandro Scarlatti – Agar et Ismaele esiliati (oratorio)
Giovanni Battista Vitali 
Sinfonia a 6
Sonate da Chiesa à due Violini, Op.9
Varie Sonate alla Francese, & all'Itagliana à sei Stromenti, Op.11

Opera
John Blow – Venus and Adonis
Juan Hidalgo de Polanco – Apolo y Leucotea
Jean-Baptiste Lully – Amadis de Gaule

Births
March 15 – Francesco Durante, composer (died 1755)
June 22 – Francesco Manfredini, violinist and composer (died 1762)
September 18 – Johann Gottfried Walther, composer and music theorist (died 1748)
September 23 – Johann Theodor Römhild, composer (died 1756)
October 30 – Maria Barbara Bach, first wife of J.S. Bach (died 1720)
date unknown 
François d' Agincour, composer (died 1758) 
Georg Christian Lehms, librettist (died 1717)

Deaths
April 12 – Nicola Amati, violin-maker of Cremona (born 1596)
May 8 – Henri Dumont, Netherlandish composer (born 1610)
July 5 – Johann Hildebrand, composer (born 1614) 
September 10 – Johann Rosenmüller, German composer (born 1619)
October 1 – Pierre Corneille, French librettist (born 1606)

References